The First Mitchell Ministry was the 15th Ministry of the Government of Western Australia and was led by Nationalist Premier James Mitchell. It succeeded the Colebatch Ministry on 17 May 1919 after the collapse of Hal Colebatch's brief service as Premier. It assumed a stability which had been absent from Western Australian politics since the 1914 election. The ministry was followed by the Collier Ministry on 15 April 1924 after the Nationalist coalition lost government at the state election held on 22 March.

First Ministry
The following ministers served until the reconstitution of the Ministry on 12 April 1921, following the 1921 state election:

Second Ministry
The following ministers served from their appointment on 12 April 1921 until the end of the Ministry on 15 April 1924, following the 1924 state election:

References

  (no ISBN)

Mitchell 1
Mitchell 1
Ministries of George V